Saridegib, also known as IPI-926, is an experimental drug candidate undergoing clinical trials for the treatment of various types of cancer, including hard-to-treat hematologic malignancies such as myelofibrosis and ligand-dependent tumors such as chondrosarcoma.  IPI-926 exhibits its pharmacological effect by inhibition of the G protein-coupled receptor smoothened, a component of the hedgehog signaling pathway.  Chemically, it is a semi-synthetic derivative of the alkaloid cyclopamine. The process begins with cyclopamine extracted from harvested Veratrum californicum which is taken through a series of alterations resulting in an analogue of the natural product cyclopamine, making IPI-926 the only compound in development/testing that is not fully synthetic.

Saridegib is a member of a class of anti-cancer compounds known as hedgehog pathway inhibitors.

References

Jervines
teratogens
Spiro compounds
Sulfonamides
Experimental cancer drugs